Prince Albert of Prussia (8 May 1837 – 13 September 1906) was a Prussian general field marshal, Herrenmeister (Grand Master) of the Order of Saint John from 1883 until his death, and regent of the Duchy of Brunswick from 1885, also until his death.

Biography
Albert was born in Berlin, the son of Prince Albert of Prussia and his wife Princess Marianne, daughter of King William I of the Netherlands. His father was a brother of King Frederick William IV of Prussia and of William I, German Emperor.

Albrecht entered the Prussian army in 1847, serving in the First Schleswig War and participating in the battles of Skalitz, Schweinschädel and Königgrätz in the Austro-Prussian War in 1866. In the Franco-Prussian War in 1870 he commanded a guard cavalry brigade at Gravelotte and Sedan. After the fall of the Second Empire, he was subordinated to Edwin von Manteuffel in the fighting around Bapaume and St. Quentin. In 1874 he became commander of the X Corps stationed in Hannover. In 1883 he succeeded his uncle Prince Charles as Herrenmeister of the Order of Saint John (Bailiwick of Brandenburg).

In 1885, Albert was chosen as Regent for the Duchy of Brunswick, as German Chancellor Otto von Bismarck had removed Ernest Augustus, Crown Prince of Hanover, from office. In 1913 Ernst August's son Ernest Augustus, Duke of Brunswick became Duke of Brunswick who only reigned for 5 years and 6 days. After accepting the regency, Albert and Marie resided chiefly in Brunswick, Berlin, and Kamenz.

Prince Albrecht died at Schloss Kamenz in 1906. He was buried in the Mausoleum auf dem Hutberge in the park of Schloss Kamenz. After World War II, the mausoleum was plundered and the bodies of Albert and his wife were reburied in the park.

Marriage and issue
On 9 April 1873 in Berlin he married Princess Marie of Saxe-Altenburg. Albert's parents had been unhappily married to each other and were later divorced. His decision to wait until he was 36 before marrying is thought to have been a reflection of his parents' marital situation.

Honours and awards
German honours

Foreign honours

Ancestry

References

External links
.

1837 births
1906 deaths
Field marshals of the German Empire
Field marshals of Prussia
House of Hohenzollern
Prussian people of the Austro-Prussian War
German military personnel of the Franco-Prussian War
Military personnel from Berlin
People from the Province of Brandenburg
Prussian princes
Regents of Germany
Recipients of the Pour le Mérite (military class)
Recipients of the Iron Cross (1870), 1st class
Grand Crosses of the Order of Saint Stephen of Hungary
Knights of the Golden Fleece of Spain
Knights Commander of the Military Order of William
Recipients of the Order of the Netherlands Lion
Honorary Knights Grand Cross of the Order of the Bath
Knights of Justice of the Order of St John